Wélissa de Souza Gonzaga, (born 9 September 1982 in Barbacena), best known as Sassá, is a volleyball player from Brazil. With the national team, she won the gold medal at the 2008 Olympic Games in Beijing.

Clubs
  Vasco da Gama (2000–2001)
  Rexona-Ades (2001–2008)
  Finasa/Osasco (2008–2009)
  Sollys/Osasco (2009–2011)
  SESI-SP (2011–2013)
  MKS Dąbrowa Górnicza (2013–2014)
  Praia Clube Uberlândia (2014–2015)
  Brasília Vôlei (2015–2016)
  Fluminense FC (2016–2019)
  Itajaí Vôlei (2020)
  Curitiba Vôlei (2020–2021)
  Moda Brusque (2021–)

Awards

Individuals
 2004–05 Salonpas Cup – "Most Valuable Player"
 2004–05 Salonpas Cup – "Best Server"
 2004–05 Salonpas Cup – "Best Receiver"
 2005 South American Championship – "Best Receiver"
 2005 FIVB World Grand Champions Cup – "Best Server"
 2005–06 Brazilian Superliga – "Best Receiver"
 2006–07 Brazilian Superliga – "Best Server"
 2009 South American Club Championship – "Best Receiver"
 2010 South American Club Championship – "Best Server"
 2011–12 Brazilian Superliga – "Best Digger"

References

 Athlete bio at 2008 Olympics website

External links
 Wélissa Gonzaga at the International Volleyball Federation
 
 
 
 

1982 births
Living people
People from Barbacena
Brazilian women's volleyball players
Volleyball players at the 2008 Summer Olympics
Olympic volleyball players of Brazil
Olympic gold medalists for Brazil
Volleyball players at the 2007 Pan American Games
Olympic medalists in volleyball
Medalists at the 2008 Summer Olympics
Pan American Games medalists in volleyball
Pan American Games silver medalists for Brazil
Wing spikers
Expatriate volleyball players in Poland
Brazilian expatriates in Poland
Medalists at the 2007 Pan American Games
Sportspeople from Minas Gerais
21st-century Brazilian women